Glynn Howell (born 11 October 1976) is a New Zealand cricketer. He played in four first-class matches for Canterbury and Wellington from 1998 to 2002.

References

External links
 

1976 births
Living people
New Zealand cricketers
Canterbury cricketers
Wellington cricketers
Cricketers from Napier, New Zealand